The 1888 Tennessee gubernatorial election was held on November 6, 1888. Incumbent Democrat Robert Love Taylor defeated Republican nominee Samuel W. Hawkins with 51.78% of the vote.

General election

Candidates
Major party candidates
Robert Love Taylor, Democratic
Samuel W. Hawkins, Republican 

Other candidates
J. C. Johnson, Prohibition

Results

References

1888
Tennessee
Gubernatorial